Mitani may refer to:

 Mitani (surname), a Japanese surname (see for a list of people with that name)
 3289 Mitani, a minor planet
 Mitani Station (Okayama), a train station in Japan
 Mitani Station (Yamaguchi), a train station in Japan

See also 
 Mitanni, an ancient state in the Near East
 Mithani, a town in Pakistan